NGC 1866 is a globular cluster in the Large Magellanic Cloud, located in the constellation of Dorado.  NGC 1866 was discovered August 3rd, 1826 by James Dunlop.

See also
Globular Cluster

References

External links

NGC 1866 on SIMBAD

1866
Globular clusters
Dorado (constellation)